Huayan Temple is a Buddhist temple located on Mount Zhiti, in Jiaocheng District of Ningde, Fujian, China. It is the ashram of the Bodhisattva Ratnakūta (天冠菩薩).

History
The temple was built in 971 by an exceptional Buddhist monk Shi Yuanbiao from Goryeo, under the Northern Song dynasty (960–1127). Over the course of 1,200 years, the temple had several names, including "Huayan Chan Temple", "Yongxi Chan Temple", "Huazang Chan Temple", and "Wanshou Chan Temple".

Architecture
The existing main buildings include the Shanmen, Four Heavenly Kings Hall, Mahavira Hall, Hall of Guru and Buddhist Texts Library.

Huayan Temple has been classified as a National Key Buddhist Temple in Han Chinese Area by the State Council of China in 1983.

Mahavira Hall
The Mahavira Hall enshrining the Three Saints of Hua-yan. In the middle is Sakyamuni, statues of Manjushri on the back of a green lion and Samantabhadra on the back of a white elephant stand on the left and right sides of Sakyamuni's statue. A  weight bronze statue of Vairocana enshrined in the hall is solemn and majestical. It was cast in 1597, in the reign of Wanli Emperor of the Ming dynasty. He wears heavenly crown and sitting on a lotus throne.

Buddhist Texts Library
The Buddhist Texts Library preserves a set of Chinese Buddhist canon, which are printed in 1599, in the 27th year of Wanli period (1573–1620) in the Ming dynasty (1368–1644).

National Treasures
A Ming dynasty purple kasaya is houses in the temple.

A total of 947 Ming dynasty stone statues of Bodhisattva Ratnakūta with different looks and manners are collected in the temple.

References

External links
 

Buddhist temples in Ningde
Buildings and structures in Ningde
Tourist attractions in Ningde
16th-century establishments in China
16th-century Buddhist temples